The 1979–80 United Counties League season was the 73rd in the history of the United Counties League, a football competition in England.

Premier Division

The Premier Division featured 19 clubs which competed in the division last season, no new clubs joined the division this season.

League table

Division One

The Division One featured 16 clubs which competed in the division last season, along with 2 new clubs, promoted from Division Two:
British Timken Duston
Ford Sports Daventry

League table

Division Two

The Division Two featured 12 clubs which competed in the division last season, along with 3 new clubs:
Raunds Town, relegated from Division One
Cottingham
Buckingham Town reserves

League table

References

External links
 United Counties League

1979–80 in English football leagues
United Counties League seasons